Maesteg Community Hospital is a community hospital in Maesteg, Wales. It is managed by Cwm Taf Morgannwg University Health Board.

History
The hospital has its origins in a temporary facility established for injured servicemen in 1914. The current hospital, which was designed by Mr J Humphreys as a permanent facility and built by Mr Tom Thomas, opened later in the war. It subsequently became a maternity hospital and joined the National Health Service as Maesteg General Hospital in 1948.

References

NHS hospitals in Wales
Hospitals in Bridgend County Borough
Hospitals established in 1914
Cwm Taf Morgannwg University Health Board